Madden NFL 23 is a 2022 American football video game developed by EA Tiburon and published by Electronic Arts. Based on the National Football League (NFL), it is the thirty-fourth installment in the Madden NFL series of video games, following the release of Madden NFL 22 (2021).

Madden NFL 23 was released in August 2022 for PlayStation 4, PlayStation 5, Windows, Xbox One, and Xbox Series X/S platforms. It also marked the series debut on the Epic Games Store. Former head coach and broadcaster John Madden, whom the game was named after, is the cover star in honor of his death in December 2021. Like previous recent installments, the game received mixed reviews from critics but was declared an improvement from previous games.

Cover art 
John Madden (who last appeared on the cover of Madden NFL 2000), was announced as the cover star on Madden Day (June 1, 2022; the same day that the series' first installment, John Madden Football, was released) in honor of his death on December 28, 2021. The cover of the next-gen version is a picture of Madden celebrating his victory as the head coach of the Oakland Raiders at Super Bowl XI. The All-Madden Edition is based on the cover of the series' first game, John Madden Football, made by Chuck Styles.

Features 
The franchise mode featured new additions, including free agency tools and additional trade factors. The PS5 and Xbox Series X/S versions of the game included new defensive animations, including mid-air collisions and tackle assists, as well as a more precise passing mechanic on offense. The game also features player-locked touchdown camera views, additional player silhouettes body types, and improved stadium details.

The John Madden Legacy Game mode was created to honor the late John Madden and featured the AFC and NFC teams, just like in the annual NFL Pro Bowl game, at the Oakland Coliseum (known in-game as "The Coliseum"), the site of the Oakland Raiders in the 1970s, featuring Madden's favorite players from the past and present, along with two versions of John Madden coaching both teams, respectively, a halftime tribute to John Madden himself, narrated by long time Raiders fan, Tre Mosley. Various quotes from John Madden are also heard in the background, as well as on the video board.

In July 2022, EA set up a phone line where gamers could call to complain about a player's rating being too low.

Madden Ultimate Team also received several notable improvements. The introduction of the new Field Pass system allows players to earn up to date rewards throughout the year. New Field Passes come out with each major program, season, and every two weeks the Competitive Field Pass releases new rewards for players to earn. There has been 4 field passes, with a different player to collect upgrade tokens to upgrade them.

On December 22, 2022, the third Nickelodeon cross-promotion event, as a tie-in to the December 25, 2022 broadcast, not only included content from SpongeBob SquarePants in The Yard mode, but allow players to take on ten challenges based on moments featuring Nickelodeon NVP winners from the 2021 Wild Card game and the 2021 NFL season and earn two exclusive Nickelodeon NVP cards (both the 2021 Wild Card game and the 2022 Christmas game (token usable on January 3, 2023)) and Spongebob gear in the Ultimate Team mode.

Alan Roach, who has been the PA announcer for the Super Bowl, the Pro Bowl and the NFL International Series, as well as the Minnesota Vikings, will be once again serving as the announcer, but only in Super Bowl matches.

Reception 

Madden NFL 23 received "mixed or average" reviews from critics, according to Metacritic.

In its 7.0/10 review, IGN wrote: "Madden NFL 23, though, provides a glimpse of a light at the end of the tunnel with a handful of smart enhancements to animations, AI, and passing mechanics that make subtle but meaningful improvements to the moment-to-moment football on the field… After playing Madden NFL 23 I finally have a little optimism that the series is on the right path — maybe not an emphatic 'Boom!', but clear forward progress for a series that so desperately needs it." Also giving the game a 7/10, GameSpot said: "This year's Madden is a lot like the past decade of Madden in that it suffers a number of self-inflicted wounds and returns features that were unpopular in years prior. However, it's crucial to reiterate, on the field, Madden genuinely feels great for the first time in a long time. The changes to Franchise are helpful but not revolutionary, the MUT Field Pass system is promising but janky at launch, and other modes are largely forgettable… The improvements on gameday make Madden 23 a flawed game, but clearly an improvement in the series' most important way: the actual playing of football." GamesRadar+ gave the game 3 out of 5 stars, saying: "Some fun improvements make this playable – yet Madden still features too much carryover. Not just from last year, but the last decade." Shacknews rated it 3 out of 5 stars calling it "a poor pro football simulator".

Save file controversy
On December 26, 2022, players began experiencing issues connecting to Madden NFL 23 Connected Franchise Mode (CFM). CFM has remained a mainstay in Madden NFL since Madden NFL 99 (1998), and was rebranded in Madden NFL 25 (2013). EA resolved the issue on December 28, although from a time period ranging from December 28 to December 29, any player that logged in would have their save files corrupted. EA was able to recover 40% of save files corrupted as a result of server issues, but many players reported that their developed franchises were suddenly gone.

References

External links
 

EA Sports games
Frostbite (game engine) games
Madden NFL
PlayStation 4 games
PlayStation 5 games
Video games developed in the United States
Video games scored by Kris Bowers
Video games set in the United States
Windows games
Xbox One games
Xbox Series X and Series S games
2022 video games
Video game controversies